The 1895 Chicago Maroons football team was an American football team that represented the University of Chicago during the 1895 college football season.  In their fourth season under head coach Amos Alonzo Stagg, the Maroons compiled a 10–3 record and outscored their opponents by a combined total of 260 to 66.

Schedule

Roster

Head coach: Amos Alonzo Stagg (4th year at Chicago)

References

Chicago
Chicago Maroons football seasons
Chicago Maroons football